The 2012 SaskTel Tankard was held February 1–5 at the Assiniboia Curling Club in Assiniboia, Saskatchewan.  The winning team of Scott Manners,  will represent Saskatchewan at the 2012 Tim Hortons Brier in Saskatoon, Saskatchewan.

Teams

Draw brackets

A Event

B Event

C Event

Playoffs

A vs. B
February 4, 7:00pm

C1 vs. C2
February 4, 7:00pm

Semi-final
February 5, 9:30am

Final
February 5, 2:00pm

References

SakTel Tankard
SaskTel Tankard